Gerhard Krohn Rollefson (1900–1955) was a professor of Chemistry at the University of California, Berkeley and a recipient of a Guggenheim Fellowship.

Background and career 
Rollefson received his bachelor's and master's degrees from the University of Wisconsin–Madison. His dissertation concerned Ebullioscopic constant measurement of mixed liquid media. He then completed his Ph.D. at the University of California, Berkeley. Rollefson was a specialist in physical chemistry and studied the impact of X-ray radiation on a variety of materials. Rollefson published a book with Milton Burton in 1939: Photochemistry and the Mechanisms of Chemical Reactions.

Rollefson was a long-serving editor of Annual Reviews in Physical Chemistry.

References

Sources
University of California bio of Rollefson
Guggenheim Fellowship page for Rollefson

1900 births
University of California, Berkeley alumni
University of California, Berkeley faculty
1955 deaths
20th-century American chemists
University of Wisconsin–Madison alumni
People from Grand Forks, North Dakota
Annual Reviews (publisher) editors